The Farm: En Veettu Thottathil (also known as The Farm: EVT) is a 2017 Malaysian Tamil language dark slasher film. The film is written and directed by Karthik Shamalan. The film consist an ensemble cast of Jaya Ganason, Mohanaraj, Mahesan Poobalan, Yugendran Maniam and Haridhass. The film is inspired by popular tale of Red Riding Hood, which gives a dark twist to the story, tells of the painful journey of a girl.

Prior to showing in local cinemas, the movie was screened at film festivals in Puerto Rico, Los Angeles and Mexico. The film opened in Malaysia and Singapore cinemas on 28 Sep 2017 to positive reception.

Plot

Inspired by the popular tale of Red Riding Hood, this Malaysian Tamil slasher film, which gives a dark twist to the story, tells of the painful journey of a girl. The Farm follows a hearing-impaired girl and her encounter with the various kinds of men in her life; one whose nice intentions hide a darker motive, one with bad intentions initially who later repents, and one who abuses women, which the director portrays as ‘an animal’.

Soundtrack
The film's soundtrack is scored by Shameshan Mani Maran.

Accolades

References

External links

Malaysian horror films
Malaysian slasher films
Films set in Malaysia
2017 horror films
Tamil-language Malaysian films
2010s Tamil-language films
2010s slasher films
Dark fantasy films